Mark Crispin Miller (born 1949) is a professor of media studies at New York University.

Background and career
In the introduction to Seeing Through Movies, Miller argues that the nature of American films has been affected by the impact of advertising. He has said that the handful of multinational corporations in control of the American media have changed youth culture's focus away from values and toward commercial interests and personal vanity.

In a June 2001 profile by Chris Hedges for The New York Times, Miller described himself a "public intellectual" and criticized television news "that is astonishingly empty and distorts reality". He has appeared on the Useful Idiots podcast and was praised by its host, Matt Taibbi.

Conspiracy-theory and disinformation promotion
In his social and political commentary, Miller frequently espouses conspiracy theories.

On social media and in other statements, Miller has promoted conspiracy theories about the September 11 attacks; anti-vaccine misinformation; the claim that Joe Biden stole the 2020 presidential election; the claim that the beheading of the journalist James Foley by ISIL was fake; and the claim that the Black Lives Matter movement is funded by the CIA. Miller is a signatory to the 9/11 Truth Statement and a member of the 9/11 Truth movement. He dislikes the term "conspiracy theory", calling the phrase a "meme" used to "discredit people engaged in really necessary kinds of investigation and inquiry." In a 2017 New York Observer interview, he said anyone using the term "in a pejorative sense" is "a witting or unwitting CIA asset".

Election fraud conspiracy theories
In his book Fooled Again, Miller claims that the 2000 and 2004 U.S. presidential elections were stolen. He has since claimed that the 2020 U.S. Presidential election was stolen.

9/11 hoax conspiracy theory

In 2016, Miller gave a speech to the Architects & Engineers for 9/11 Truth. After a "truthers" symposium on 9/11, Miller told Vice that the official explanations for 9/11 and John F. Kennedy's assassination "are just as unscientific as the ones that everybody feels comfortable ridiculing".

Sandy Hook Elementary School massacre hoax conspiracy theory
In a blog post, Miller suggested that the Sandy Hook Elementary School massacre was a hoax; in a subsequent interview, he denied that any children died in the shooting and voiced "suspicion" that "it was staged" or was "some kind of an exercise." Miller praised a Sandy Hook denial book by James Fetzer as "compelling" (a $450,000 defamation judgment had previously been entered against Fetzer, after the father of one of the murdered Sandy Hook students sued him for false statements made in the book).

Anti-vaccination and COVID misinformation
Miller has also screened for his students the anti-vaccination film Vaxxed, produced by disgraced former physician Andrew Wakefield (who was struck off the medical register in the UK for scientific misconduct). Miller has spread COVID-19 misinformation, including misleading claims about the efficacy of face masks and false claims that COVID-19 vaccines alter recipients' DNA.

Books
Miller's books include:

Seeing Through Movies (edited, 1990)
The Bush Dyslexicon: Observations on a National Disorder (2001)
Cruel and Unusual: Bush/Cheney's New World Order (2004)
Fooled Again: How the Right Stole the 2004 Election and Why They'll Steal the Next One Too (Unless We Stop Them) (2005)
Loser Take All : Election Fraud and the Subversion of Democracy, 2000-2008 (December 2008)

See also
2004 United States election voting controversies

References

External links

 Official faculty biography from New York University's Steinhardt School of Culture, Education, and Human Development
 Official blog
 
 

1949 births
20th-century American male writers
9/11 conspiracy theorists
American conspiracy theorists
American male non-fiction writers
American media critics
American political writers
Johns Hopkins University alumni
Living people
New York University faculty
Northwestern University alumni
American anti-vaccination activists